Ujah Uloko (born 10 August 1999) is a Nigerian professional footballer who plays as a centre-back for Iraqi Premier League club Al Ramadi FC.

Club career
Uloko signed for Nigerian Premier League side Nasarawa United in July 2018.
After impressing in two seasons, he joined Nigerian Premier League side Katsina United on a 6-month deal.
He then moved abroad and signed with Iraqi side Al-Nasiriya in September 2020, he served as captain of the club.
During the summber transfer window of 2021, he joined Iraqi Premier League club Al Ramadi FC.

References

External links

1999 births
Living people
Nigerian footballers
Expatriate footballers in Iraq
Association football defenders
Nigeria Professional Football League players
Nigerian expatriate footballers
Nasarawa United F.C. players
Katsina United F.C. players
Iraqi Premier League players
Sportspeople from Kaduna